United States v. Stumbo, was a Federal Court case in the Eastern District of California in which the 23 year old defendant, Tyler Stumbo, was convicted of conspiracy to distribute anabolic steroids, which were at the time a Class III prohibited substance. This was a violation of Title 21 sections 841(a)(1), 841(b)(1)(D) and 846, and carried a minimum penalty of 10 years in prison and a maximum penalty of Life in prison as well as a maximum fine of $250,000. The charges were filed by the DEA.

Summary
Stumbo was arrested with more than eight kilogrammes of anabolic steroids when the DEA raided his underground laboratories. Stumbo was also in possession of several guns at the time. The arrest was part of Operation Raw Deal, which targeted the black market manufacturers and distributors of anabolic steroid, human growth hormone and insulin growth factor. A total of 124 people were arrested, and 56 laboratories were seized in that operation. 500 pounds of raw material used for the production of the goods was sourced from China. Often the end user was

Stumbo pushed his illicit drugs in bodybuilding website advertisements. His distribution business went by the name of Osoca Laboratories, and posed as an ordinary firm. Communication between Stumbo and the DEA was originated via e-mail. Stumbo used Hushmail as his e-mail service provider. The DEA arranged with Stumbo to purchase by money order his steroid merchandise through a UPS Store maildrop, and discovered that the owner was Stumbo.

In order to satisfy the Court that the DEA information was true, the DEA needed to obtain Stumbo's e-mail records. The market differentiation of Hushmail is that it provides secure communication via its PGP Java client-server technology. It was revealed in an interview with Hushmail's CTO that the company complies with British Columbia Supreme Court orders to produce evidence when so requested by competent authorities. This includes warrants approved by the Minister of Justice under the Mutual Legal Assistance in Criminal Matters Act (Canada). Foreign authorities must make a formal request to the Solicitor-General of Canada who then applies, with sworn affidavits, for an order from the Court.

On 25 January 2012, Stumbo was sentenced to 36 months of probation with 120 days to be served in home detention with electronic monitoring after a conviction was obtained. In October 2012, the remainder of Stumbo's probation was terminated.

References

2007 in United States case law
Cryptographic software
Webmail
Internet privacy software
OpenPGP
 MLAT
2007 in Canadian law